Paul Röwer (born 26 May 1995) is a German footballer who plays as a striker for Energie Cottbus in the 3. Liga.

Club career 

Röwer is a youth exponent from  Energie Cottbus. He made his 2. Bundesliga debut at 26 April 2014 against FSV Frankfurt. He replaced Erik Jendrišek after 56 minutes in a 3-1 away defeat. He scored the only goal for his team.

References 

1995 births
Living people
German footballers
Association football forwards
2. Bundesliga players
FC Energie Cottbus players
Footballers from Berlin
FC Viktoria 1889 Berlin players